XHRLM-FM (branded as Exa FM) is a Spanish & English Top 40 (CHR) radio station that serves Ciudad Mante, Tamaulipas, Mexico.

History
XHRLM received its concession in 1978. It was initially owned by Ricardo López Méndez, a former XEW announcer and poet. After his death in 1989, XHRLM was sold to Enrique Cárdenas González, a PRI politician, former mayor of Ciudad Victoria and one-time governor of Tamaulipas.

References

External links
Official website
Exa 91.9 FM
Organización Radiofonica Tamaulipeca

Radio stations in Ciudad Mante